Infiniti is a luxury car brand by Japanese automaker Nissan Motor Company.

Infiniti may also refer to:

 Infiniti (album), the debut album of Pakistani musician Salman Ahmad
 Infiniti Mall, a chain of shopping malls in India
 Infiniti Retail, a subsidiary of Tata Group; see Cromā

See also
 Infinity (disambiguation)